Jordin Jae Andrade (born May 5, 1992) is a track and field hurdler representing Cape Verde at the Olympics in 2016 and 2020 and World Championships in 2017. He specializes in the 400-meter hurdles. He was a silver medalist in the event at 2015 NCAA Division I Outdoor Track and Field Championships.

High school career
Andrade finished third in the 2010 Washington State High School Track and Field Championships in 1600 meter relay and fifth in 300 m hurdles in 39.02 s. He attended Bonney Lake High School in Bonney Lake, Washington.

College career
Andrade finished first in the 2011 Southern California Community College Championships in 400 meter hurdles in 51.98 s. He was 2011 400H champion USATF Junior Outdoor Championships in 51.61. Following this feat he then went on to place 2nd at the Junior Pan-Am games representing USA in Miramar, Florida.

Andrade finished first in the 2012 California Community College Championships in 400 meter hurdles in 50.94 s. He attended Mt. San Antonio College in Walnut, California. Following Mt. SAC, he continued his education at Boise State University.

Andrade finished first in the 400 meters at the 2013 Mountain West Conference Indoor Championships. He finished first in the 400 meters hurdles at the 2013 Mountain West Conference Outdoor Championships and was champion 4x400m relay (3:12.44) at the 2013 Mountain West Conference Outdoor Championships.

Andrade finished second in the 400 meter hurdles at 2015 NCAA Division I Outdoor Track and Field Championships in 49.24.

Andrade won his final Mountain West Conference titles in May 2015. He graduated with a degree in Environmental Studies in 2015.

Professional
Andrade won gold in 400 hurdles at 2017 Jeux de la Francophonie and placed 26th in 50.32 at World Championships. He placed second in 49.91 at the 2017 So Cal Jim Bush Championships USATF West Region Track & Field Championships at Pomona Pitzer on June 3. Andrade placed 5th in 50.06 at the 2017 Jamaica Invitational 400 meters hurdles final in May. On May 3 at the Track Town, U.S.A. Oregon Twilight Invitational Meet record was set in Men's 400m Hurdle by Andrade in 50.88, breaking the old mark of 50.89 set in 1989 by B. Wright. Andrade placed 5th in 51.29 in 2017 Mt. SAC Relays 400 meters hurdles Invitational final in April.	

Andrade was selected to represent Cape Verde at the 2016 Olympics. He qualified into the semi-final round, where he placed 16th in 49.32. Andrade placed third in 400 hurdles at 2016 Mt SAC Relays. Andrade is 51st in the world rankings in the 400 hurdles.

Jordin's uncle Henry Andrade, was elected to run for the Cape Verde Islands in the 1996 Olympics.

Andrade placed 16th in the 400 hurdles at 2015 USA Outdoor Track and Field Championships held at Hayward Field in Eugene, Oregon. He met the 400 hurdles Athletics at the 2016 Summer Olympics – Qualification at 2015 NCAA Division I Outdoor Track and Field Championships.

Andrade placed 17th in the 400 hurdles at 2013 USA Outdoor Track and Field Championships  held at Drake Stadium in Des Moines, Iowa.

World Express Sports Management represents Jordin with agent Mark Pryor.

References

External links
 

Living people
1992 births
Track and field athletes from Washington (state)
Cape Verdean male hurdlers
Junior college men's track and field athletes in the United States
Athletes (track and field) at the 2016 Summer Olympics
Olympic athletes of Cape Verde
World Athletics Championships athletes for Cape Verde
Boise State Broncos men's track and field athletes
American people of Cape Verdean descent
Athletes (track and field) at the 2019 African Games
African Games competitors for Cape Verde
Athletes (track and field) at the 2020 Summer Olympics